Manuel Soeiro Vasques (29 July 1926 – 10 July 2003) was a Portuguese footballer who played as a forward.

Club career
Born in Barreiro, Setúbal District, Vasques joined Sporting CP in 1946, from local club G.D. CUF. During his spell in Lisbon he appeared in 349 games all competitions comprised and scored 225 goals, being part of an attacking line dubbed Cinco Violinos (Five Violins) that also included Albano, Jesus Correia, Fernando Peyroteo and José Travassos and winning ten major titles, including eight Primeira Liga championships.

In the 1950–51 season, Vasques led the scoring charts at 29 goals to help the Lions win the domestic league 11 ahead of second-placed FC Porto.

International career
Vasques won 26 caps for the Portugal national team over nine years, netting eight times. His debut came on 21 March 1948 in a 3–0 friendly loss against Spain, in Madrid.

Personal life
Vasques' uncle, Manuel Soeiro, was also a footballer. He too played for Sporting and Portugal.

References

External links

1926 births
2003 deaths
Sportspeople from Barreiro, Portugal
Portuguese footballers
Association football forwards
Primeira Liga players
G.D. Fabril players
Sporting CP footballers
Atlético Clube de Portugal players
Portugal international footballers